Arne Wilhelm Kaurin Tiselius (10 August 1902 – 29 October 1971) was a Swedish biochemist who won the Nobel Prize in Chemistry in 1948 "for his research on electrophoresis and adsorption analysis, especially for his discoveries concerning the complex nature of the serum proteins."

Education
Tiselius was born in Stockholm. Following the death of his father, the family moved to Gothenburg where he went to school, and after graduation at the local "Realgymnasium" in 1921, he studied at the Uppsala University, specializing in chemistry.

Career and research
Tiselius became a research assistant at Theodor Svedberg's laboratory in 1925 and obtained his doctoral degree in 1930 on the moving-boundary method of studying the electrophoresis of proteins. From then to 1935 he published a number of papers on diffusion and adsorption in naturally occurring base-exchanging zeolites, and these studies continued during a year's visit to Hugh Stott Taylor's laboratory in Princeton University with support of a Rockefeller Foundation fellowship. On his return to Uppsala he resumed his interest in proteins, and the application of physical methods to biochemical problems. This led to a much-improved method of electrophoretic analysis which he refined in subsequent years.

Tiselius took an active part in the reorganization of scientific research in Sweden in the years following World War II, and was President of the International Union of Pure and Applied Chemistry 1951–1955. He was chairman of the board for the Nobel Foundation from 1960 to 1964.

Quotation from Arne Tiselius
We live in a world where unfortunately the distinction between true and false appears to become increasingly blurred by manipulation of facts, by exploitation of uncritical minds, and by the pollution of the language. Arne Tiselius

Awards and honours
1948 Nobel Prize for Chemistry
 1949 Elected a Foreign Associate of the National Academy of Sciences
 1953 Elected to the American Academy of Arts and Sciences
1957 Elected a Foreign Member of the Royal Society (ForMemRS).
1961 Paul Karrer Gold Medal
1964 Elected to the American Philosophical Society

The lunar crater Tiselius was named in his honour.

Personal life
Tiselius was married, with two children. He died of a heart attack 29 October 1971 in Uppsala. His wife died in 1986.

References

External links 
  including the Nobel Lecture on December 13, 1948 Electrophoresis and Adsorption Analysis as Aids in Investigations of Large Molecular Weight Substances and Their Breakdown Products

1902 births
1971 deaths
Scientists from Stockholm
Swedish biochemists
Uppsala University alumni
Swedish Nobel laureates
Academic staff of Uppsala University
Nobel laureates in Chemistry
Foreign Members of the Royal Society
Foreign associates of the National Academy of Sciences
Burials at Uppsala old cemetery
Members of the German Academy of Sciences at Berlin
Members of the American Philosophical Society